The silky wainscot (Chilodes maritimus) is a moth of the family Noctuidae. It is found in most of Europe including Russia.

Technical description and variation

N. maritima Tausch (= sericea Curt., anella Stph.). Forewing silky grey: the veins pale grey, the intervals darker, stigmata pale, hardly perceptible; outer line alone represented by a curved row of black vein-dots; hindwing pure white, with traces of an outer row of dark dots; — ab. ulvae Hbn. has the forewing along the centre rufous ochreous, the costa dark grey with the veins pale; the stigmata lined with white; outer line of dots followed by a dark shade and a row of minute dots before termen; hindwing ochreous white, with a grey cellspot and outer row of dots; — in ab. bipunctata Haw. (= nigromaculata Schmidt) (48 e) the two stigmata are deep black, with a small black spot at base of cell; in wismariensis Schmidt a broad black stripe runs longitudinally through the middle of wing from base to termen;— in nigrocostata Stgr. a broad black stripe runs along the costa; — nigristriata Stgr. is more like the typical grey form but with many black streaks running parallel to the veins. Larva ochreous with fine dark and light longitudinal lines; bead and thoracic plate brown. The wingspan is 29–36 mm.

Biology
Adults are on wing from June to August.

The larvae are partially carnivorous, feeding on insects (including pupae of other wainscots) internally within the stems of Phragmites australis.

References

External links

Silky Wainscot on UKmoths
Fauna Europaea
Chilodes maritima on Lepiforum.de

Hadeninae
Moths of Europe
Moths of Asia